Gulakai Kot (ګوړاکای کلى یا شیرکل کوټ) is a remote village in Afghanistan. It is located at the district of Shwak, in the eastern province of Paktia. It belongs to Shabak Khel tribe, one of the five major Zadran tribes.

History 

The Shabak Khel tribe is split into two sub-tribes: the Fath-e Khel and Sub Khel.

Fath-e Khel (Pat-e Khel) had three sons:
 Mirwali
 Jaburi
 Lucchi

Sub Khel had three sons:
 Paio
 Bui
 Shamshiray

Paio had seven sons, one of whom was named Nurkhun.

Nurkhun had six sons:
 Gulakai
 Madaki
 Mataki
 Janak
 Bijun
 Jun
 Hun

Gulakai had four sons:
 Shergol
 Pirmamad (Pir Muhammad)
 Niermamad (Noor Muhammad)
 Shalai

Shergol had one son:

His name was Miralam and was also known as Sattak.

Sattak had Four sons :

 Shabaz Khan
 Chargul Khan
 Taybghan Khan
 Wakil Majan

Shabaz Khan had three sons:
 Nurbaz Khan
 Janbaz Khan
 Haji Zaher Khan

Chargul Khan had two sons:
 Gulabaz Khan
 Wazirbaz Khan

Taybghan Khan had three sons:
 Asil Khan
 Nizirban Khan
 Janagol Khan

Wakil Majan had three sons:
 Dawud Jan Paktiawal
 Haji Amin Jan Paktiawal
 Haji Hakim Jan Paktiawal

Tribal leaders of Gulakai Kot in Afghan history

The known tribal leaders of the village in the 21st century were also the first members of the Zadran tribe in the Afghan parliament between 1958 and 1973, during the reign of King Mohammed Sahir Schah. These two were Muhammad Jan (also called Majan Wakil) and Ir Mohammad (Irmahmad) Wakil.

They were not only representatives of the village and the Shabak Khel tribe but were also representatives of the entire tribe of Zadran from the eastern province of Afghanistan. They were participating in the parliament as tribal and national representatives from the province of Paktia.

Pakistan independence war

The people of Paktia province have not only fought in the independence wars of Afghanistan (Afghan-Anglo Wars), but they also fought in the independence of Pakistan, for which the first government of Pakistan granted the title of defenders of Freedom to the fighters from Paktia Province. The government of Pakistan also granted land and immunity in Pakistan to the fighters. Among those freedom fighters were two famous and known commanders from the village of Gulakai Kot who were named Chargol Khan and Pate Jang who led the Afghan guerillas who were participating in the fight for the independence of Pakistan. After Pakistan was liberated, they returned home.

Chargol Khan and Pate Jang from Gulakai Kot

Chargol Khan had four brothers. One of them was Muhammad Jan (Majan) Wakil who was one of the two commanders of the guerillas. The second commander was Pate Jang in the fight for independence of Pakistan.

As a gift for their contribution and liberation of Pakistan, they were granted huge land, property and immunity from persecution in the new Pakistani nation state.

The tribes of Paktia choose them both to be their leaders in the guerrilla war against the Indian army. In the year 1948, they both were leading fierce tribal Afghans against the Indian army. After bloody fights, they pushed the Indian army back from where they were occupied in the Indian Subcontinent and captured large parts of Kashmir. Mirpur and Jatla were among them in fierce fighting against Sikhs and Indian troops in Bara Bura near Srinagar, Kashmir. Pate Jang was killed by the Indian army in battle.

Chargol Khan imprisoned in British-India

In the time when India was occupied by England, Chargol Khan was captured by the British Army and sent to prison.

As per folklore, there was a British commander in charge who said to Chargol Khan: "You Afghans are known to be strong wrestler. If you beat one of my men, I will reduce a year in your jail term but if you lose you will get five years in jail extra."

Then Chargol Khan and a British soldier started wrestling and Chargol Khan defeated the soldier. As a result of his win against the British man, he was given a reward and reduction in his jail term.

After the defeat of the soldier, Chargol's colleagues were not only happy to defame the wrestlers of the British majesty, but he also won the hearts and minds of fellow prisoners.

The British commander was surprised by the strength of Chargol, so he said to him, "In the mountain, there is a big snake. If you kill this snake, we shall reduce your prison term for another time."

Chargol Khan agreed with him and went to the mountains. They gave him an axe to defeat the snake. The people who were watching Chargol Khan were impressed, as how he killed the big snake, "Anaconda". He was rewarded for his strength and once more his jail sentence was reduced.

The British Army asked him to come with them to the UK. Chargoal said, "I can't come with you because i have left my family back, of whom i have to take care of". When he was in Khost, he met a good friend named Bubrak Khan and spent a few days with him. After this, he went back to his home (Gulakai Kot).

The people of the village

Shergol Kot (also called Gulakai) had had many famous fighters. Most people of this village fought not only against British-India but also are known for their ferocity against the Russian and Communist army in Afghanistan.

In many countries, like Germany, England, Spain, Italy, Saudi Arabia and Pakistan, there are quite a few people who emigrated from Shergol Kot to escape the wars.

Populated places in Paktia Province